The Liberal Party (abbr. ЛС or LS) was a political party in the Kingdom of Serbia that existed from 1883 to 1895 and was led by historian Jovan Ristić and lawyer Jovan Avakumović (1841–1928).

History
The "Liberals" (либерали / liberali), an opposition group formed in the 1840s, established the Association of Serbian Youth in 1847 (banned in 1851 by the Defenders of the Constitution). These liberals participated in the May Assembly (1–3 May 1848) in Sremski Karlovci and the Petrovdan Assembly (29 June 1848) in Kragujevac. The liberals had an important role in the overthrow of the regime of Prince Aleksandar Karađorđević in 1858, which resulted in the return of the rival Obrenović dynasty. Liberals founded the United Serb Youth. Their ideas were close to those of Jovan Ristić (the later leader of LS). The Liberals were Russophiles and Obrenović-supporters, closely linked with the Serbian Orthodox Church and especially with Metropolitan Mihailo who himself was a liberal. In national politics, they had the aim of liberation of all Serbs. On the political spectrum, the Liberals were between the Conservatives and the Markovićevci (followers of Svetozar Marković, who later founded the People's Radical Party in 1881).

Liberals founded the Society for the Promotion of Serbian Literature (Дружина за помагање српске књижевности) in 1881, then transformed the organization into a political party, the Liberal Party, in 1883.

Leaders
Jovan Ristić (1831–1899), historian and diplomat, party leader in 1883–89
Jovan Avakumović (1841–1928), lawyer, party leader in 1889–95

Liberal Prime Ministers

See also
Liberalism in Serbia

References

Political parties in the Kingdom of Serbia
Liberalism in Serbia
Liberal parties in Serbia
Defunct liberal political parties
1883 establishments in Serbia
1895 disestablishments in Europe
Political parties established in 1883
Political parties disestablished in 1895